New Educational College (NEC) was founded in 1961 and is a private secondary school in Bel Air, Rivière Sèche, Mauritius.

See also
 List of secondary schools in Mauritius 
 Education in Mauritius

External links
 New Educational College website 

Schools in Mauritius
Educational institutions established in 1961
1961 establishments in Mauritius